Ludmilla Sirotková is a Czechoslovak retired slalom canoeist who competed from the mid-1960s to the early 1970s. She won three medals at the ICF Canoe Slalom World Championships with a gold (Mixed C-2: 1965) and two bronzes (Mixed C-2: 1971, Mixed C-2 team: 1965).

References

Czechoslovak female canoeists
Possibly living people
Year of birth missing (living people)
Medalists at the ICF Canoe Slalom World Championships